Lin is the Mandarin romanization of the Chinese surname written 林. It is also used in Taiwan, Japan, Korea, Singapore, Indonesia, Malaysia, Vietnam, Thailand and Cambodia.

Among Taiwanese and Chinese families from abroad, it is sometimes pronounced and spelled as Lim because many Chinese descendants are part of the Southern Min diaspora that speak Min Nan, Hokkien or  Teochew. In Cantonese-speaking regions such as Hong Kong and Macau it is spelled as Lam or Lum.

It is listed 147th on the Hundred Family Surnames. Within mainland China, it is currently the 18th most common surname.

In Japan, the character 林 is also used but goes by the pronunciation Hayashi, which is the 19th most common surname in Japan.

Name origin
King Zhou of Shang (reigned 1154 to 1122 BC), the last king of the Shang dynasty, had three uncles advising him and his administration. The king's uncles were Prince Bi Gan, Prince Jizi, and Prince Weizi. Together the three princes were known as "The Three Kind-Hearted Men of Shang" in the kingdom. Prince Bi Gan was the son of King Wen Ding; he was the brother of King Zhou's father and, thus, was King Zhou's uncle, and served as the prime minister of the Kingdom of Shang.

King Zhou was a cruel king, but his three uncles could not persuade him to change his ways. Failing in their duty to advise the king, Prince Weizi resigned. Prince Jizi faked insanity and was relieved of his post. Only Prince Bi Gan stayed on to continue advising the king to change his ways. "Servants who are afraid of being killed and refrain from telling the truth are not righteous" he said. This put him in danger of incurring the king's wrath. Prince Bi Gan stayed at the palace for three days and nights to try to persuade the blood-thirsty and immoral king to mend his ways.

The stubborn king would not relent and had Prince Bi Gan arrested for treason. Upon hearing this, his pregnant wife escaped into the forest and went into labor there. With no one to help her, she gave birth to a boy in the rocky cave in the forest, in a placed called Chang Lin (長林).

Before long, King Zhou of Shang was overthrown by Ji Fa, the Count of the West (Western Shang). Ji Fa established a new dynasty named the Zhou dynasty and became the King Wu of Zhou. King Wu knew about the courageous prime minister Prince Bi Gan and sought his wife and child. When he found them, he honoured them in respect of Prince Bi Gan. The mother and child were restored to the Shang royal family. King Wu of Zhou conferred the surname Lin (meaning forest) and the Dukedom of Bo'ling on Prince Bi Gan's son, Lin (Lim/Lam) Jian (林坚), ennobled as the Duke of Bo'ling.

Other origins
 from Lin Kai (林開), son of the King Ping of Zhou
 from Lin Fang (林放), an official in Lu, also a student of Confucius, during the Spring and Autumn period
 adopted by South China's aboriginal tribes
 adopted by the Qiu Lin (丘林) ethnic Xianbei, family as the surname during the Northern Wei dynasty
 from the personal name of Lin Fu (林父), the given name of an official in the state of Wei during the Spring and Autumn period, whose original surname was Sun.
 from name of a fief granted to an official in the State of Ju during the Spring and Autumn period

Distribution
Within China, 林 is the 2nd most common surname in Fujian, 4th most common in the city of Haikou, and 10th most common in the city of Guangzhou.

In 2019 it was the 18th most common surname in Mainland China.

Different versions of the name
Among the Malaysian Chinese it is not commonly spelled Lin but rather Lim or Lam. The Hakka, Hokkien, Teochew and Hainan communities romanize it as "Lim" whereas the Cantonese-speaking community uses "Lam".
The Korean surname Im ( in South Korean spelling;  in North Korean spelling; commonly romanized as Lim or Rim) is the Korean pronunciation of the same Chinese character (林). A much less common Korean surname Im is derived from another character (spelled  Im in both North and South Korean) the character used to write the surname Ren. In Korean, the former is called Supul Rim (수풀 림) and the latter Matgil Im (맡길 임) when they need to be distinguished.
A common Japanese surname, Hayashi, is written with the same character 林 and also means forest. A much rarer Japanese surname, Rin, is also written with same character.
The Vietnamese surname, "Lâm", was formerly written using the same character.
In Singapore, although "Lim" and "Lam" are generally more common variants, the extremely rare spelling "Lyn" can be found in select families of Chinese, Japanese, or other East Asian ancestry (also transcribed using the 林 character) and bears no known relation to the English or Scottish surname of the same spelling, or alternate spelling "Ling".
A rare Chinese surname which is also transcribed Lin is 藺 / 蔺 (pinyin Lìn), for example the Warring States period statesman Lin Xiangru .
Indonesians of Chinese ancestry bearing this surname sometimes spell it as "Liem", pronounced from Fuqing dialect.
Prominent Thai Chinese royalist families with this surname are bestowed by member of the royal family some indigenised derivative such as "Limthongkul" "Sirilim" "Limpisthira." 
The character "霖" (Lín, "heavy rain showers") is also a popular personal name among ethnic Chinese people.

Notable people surnamed Lin
This is an East Asian name, meaning the surname is stated "before" the given name, though East Asian persons living in Western countries will often put their surname after their given name.

Lin
Mandarin and Wu Chinese:
 Lin Biao (林彪), military general and former Vice Premier of the People's Republic of China
 Lin Bih-jaw (林碧炤 Lin Bizhao), Secretary-General to the President of the Republic of China (2016)
 Lin Bu (林逋), poet
 Lin Chen-yi (林镇夷 Lin Zhenyi), Chief of the General Staff of the Republic of China Armed Forces (2009–2013)
 Lin Chih-chia (林志嘉 Lin Zhijia), Secretary-General of Legislative Yuan
 Lin Chih-chien (林智堅 Lin Zhijian), Mayor of Hsinchu City
 Lin Chih-sheng (林智盛 Lin Zhisheng), Taiwanese baseball player
 Lin Chi-ling (林志玲 Lin Zhiling), Taiwanese supermodel, actress
 Lin Ching-Liang (林清凉 Lin Qingliang), Taiwanese nuclear physicist
 Lin Chin-tien (林金田 Lin Jintian), Political Deputy Minister of Culture of the Republic of China (2012–2013)
 Lin Chuan (林全 Lin Quan), Premier of the Republic of China (2016–2017)
 Lin Chu-chia (林祖嘉 Lin Zujia), Minister of National Development Council of the Republic of China (2016)
 Lin Dan (林丹), world Olympic champion, men's singles badminton player, People's Republic of China
 Lin Di (林笛), musician, pipa player with Chinese rock band Cold Fairyland
 Lin Fangling (林芳灵) (born 2001), Chinese badminton player
 Lin Fang-yue (林芳郁) Taiwanese cardiologist, hospital superintendent, and health minister (2008)
 Lin Fong-cheng, Vice Chairman of Kuomintang (2007–2014)
 Lin Hejie (Lim Ho Kiat 林贺杰), painter and commentator
 Lin Hwai-min, choreographer and founder of Taiwan's Cloud Gate Dance Theater
 Lin Hsi-shan, Secretary-General of the Legislative Yuan (1999–2016)
 Lin Hsi-yao, Vice Premier of the Republic of China (2016–2017)
 Lin Jeng-yi, Director of National Palace Museum of Taiwan (2016–2018)
 Lin Join-sane, Secretary-General of Kuomintang (2012)
 Lin Jun Jie, Singaporean singer and songwriter
 Lin Junq-tzer, Governor of Taiwan Province (2010–2016)
 Shu Qi (Lin Li-hui 林立慧), Taiwanese actress and model
 Lin Ling-san, Minister of Transportation and Communications (2002–2006)
 Lin Mei-chu, Minister of Labor of the Republic of China (2017–2018)
 Lin Ming-chen, Magistrate of Nantou County
 Lin Neng-pai, Minister of Public Construction Commission of the Republic of China (2000–2002)
 Lin Peng, actress
 Lin Qingfeng (林清峰), world Olympic champion, weightlifter, athlete
 Lin Sang, world Olympic silver medalist, athlete, archer
 Lin San-quei, Vice Minister of Labor of the Republic of China
 Lin Sen, former president, chairman of National Government of China
 Lin Shicheng musician, Shanghai-born pipa player
 Lin Shihong (林士弘), king of Chu dynasty
 Lin Shu-chen, Administrative Deputy Minister of Education of the Republic of China (2013–2016)
 Lin Teng-chiao, Administrative Deputy Minister of Education of the Republic of China
 Lin Tsung-hsien, Minister of Council of Agriculture of the Republic of China (2017–2018)
 Lin Tzou-yien, Minister of Health and Welfare of the Republic of China (2016–2017)
 Lin Tzu-ling, Administrative Deputy Minister of the Interior of the Republic of China
 Lin Wan-i, Deputy Magistrate of Taipei County (1999–2002)
 Lin Weining (林伟宁), world Olympic champion, weightlifter, athlete 
 Lin Wenyue, scholar, writer and translator from Taiwan.
 Lin Xiangru, Chinese politician of the Warring States period
 Lin Xu (林旭), scholar, poet 
 Lin Yang-kang, former mayor of Taipei city, Chairman of Taiwan province, Taiwanese politician
 Lin Yanjun, Taiwanese singer and actor, former member of Nine Percent
 Lin Yi-shih, Secretary-General of Executive Yuan (2012)
 Lin Yongsheng (林永昇), Chinese admiral
 Lin Youren, musician, Chinese guqin player
 Lin Youyi (林有懿), Hong Kong-born Singaporean television host and actress
 Lin Yuan-lang, Magistrate of Nantou County (1989–1997)
 Lin Yu-chang, Mayor of Keelung City
 Lin Yu-chun Taiwanese singer
 Lin Yue (林跃), world Olympic champion, diver
 Lin Yu-fang, Taiwanese politician
 Lin Yutang, inventor, linguist, writer, Nobel prize nominee 
 Lin Zexu, nineteenth-century governor-general, imperial commissioner, poet, scholar, diplomat
 Alfred Lin, Taiwanese-born American venture capitalist
 Ariel Lin (Lin Yi-chen), Taiwanese actress
 Brigitte Lin (林青霞, Lin Ch'ing-hsia), Taiwanese film actress
 Cho-Liang Lin, musician, U.S. Taiwanese violinist, "Instrumentalist of the Year" in 2000
 David Lin (born 1950), Minister of Foreign Affairs of the Republic of China (2012–2016)
 Douglas N. C. Lin, astrophysicist
 Estrella Lin (Lin Wei-ling 林韋伶), Taiwanese singer
Francis Y. Lin, Chinese linguist
 Jenny Lin, musician, pianist
 Jeremy Lin (林書豪, Lin Shu-hao), U.S. basketball player
 Jimmy Lin (林志穎, Lin Chih-ying), Taiwanese film actor and singer
 Justin Lin, U.S. film director
 Justin Yifu Lin, former Chief Economist of the World Bank
 Kelly Lin (林熙蕾),  Taiwanese actress, model
 Kevin Lin (林義傑), marathon runner
 Lucia Lin, Political Deputy Minister of Education of the Republic of China (2014–2016)
 Maya Lin, artist and architect
 Ruby Lin (林心如, Lin Xin-ru), Taiwanese actress
 Tzu-Wei Lin, infielder for the Boston Red Sox
 Lin Siyi (林思意), Chinese singer, actress, and member of Chinese idol girl group SNH48

Lam
Cantonese form
Adrian Lam, coach
Barry Lam, billionaire and founder of Quanta Computer
Bowie Lam, Hong Kong actor and singer
Lam Bun, radio commentator
Lam Bun-Ching, concert pianist and composer
Carol Lam, former United States Attorney for the Southern District of California
Carrie Lam Cheng Yuet-ngor, Chief Executive of Hong Kong
Chet Lam, singer/songwriter
David Lam, Lieutenant Governor of British Columbia, Canada
Derek Lam, U.S. fashion designer
Eman Lam, musician
Francis Lam Po-chuen, voice actor
George Lam, singer
James Lam, author and consultant
Karen Lam, Canadian filmmaker
Karen Lam, diabetes and obesity researcher
Karena Lam, actress
Lam Kor-wan, serial killer
Lam Nhat Tien, Vietnamese American singer
Nora Lam, Chinese Christian Ministry and the author of "China Cry"
Pat Lam, rugby player
Raymond Lam, Hong Kong entertainer
Richard Lam, lyricist
Ringo Lam, film director
Lam Sai-wing, Student of Wong Fei-hung
Sandy Lam, Hong Kong Cantopop singer
Sarah Lam, actress
Stephen Lam, government official
Tony Lam, politician
Wifredo Lam, Cuban artist
Willy Wo-Lap Lam, Hong Kong political commentator

Lum
Alternate Cantonese form
Agnes Lum, U.S. model and J-pop singer
Awkwafina or Nora Lum, U.S. rapper
Olivia Lum, Singaporean businesswoman

Lim
Southern Min or Hokkien or Teochew
Lim Ban Lim, Singaporean secret society member and gunman
Lim Bo Seng, World War II anti-Japanese Resistance fighter based in Singapore and British Malaya
Lim Boon Keng, Singaporean national reformist of Peranakan descent
Lim Chin Chong, Malaysian male prostitute and convicted killer executed in Singapore
Lim Chin Siong, cofounder of Singapore's People's Action Party (P.A.P.)
Lim Chin Tsong (林振宗), Overseas Chinese oil tycoon during British Burma
Lim Chong Eu (林苍祐), former Malaysian-born Singaporean politician
Lim Giong, Singaporean Taiwanese musician, songwriter and actor
Lim Goh Tong (林梧桐), Fujianese billionaire and founder of Genting Group
Lim Guan Eng (林冠英), Malaysian politician, former Chief Minister of Penang (2008–2018) and current Minister of Finance of Malaysia (2018–present)
Lim Hng Kiang (林勛強), Singapore Minister for Trade and Industry
Lim Hock Soon, Singaporean nightclub owner and murder victim
Lim Hwee Huang, Singaporean victim of a rape and murder case
Lim Kim Huat, Malaysian gunman executed in Singapore
Lim Kim San (林金山), Singaporean politician noted for contributions to public housing policy
Lim Kit Siang (林吉祥), Malaysian politician, known as Mr. Opposition
Lim Kok Yew, Malaysian gunman executed in Singapore
Lim Koon Teck, first person of East Asian descent to be appointed to the British Colonial Legal Service during the twentieth century
Lim Lye Hock, Singaporean rapist and killer
Lim Nee Soon, prominent Singapore pioneer and community leader, rubber magnate and banker
Norman Kwong (Lim Kwong Yew), former professional athlete and Lieutenant Governor of Alberta, Canada
Lim Por-yen (林百欣), Hong Kong industrialist
 Lim Shiow Rong (林秀蓉 Lín Xiùróng), Singaporean and victim of an unsolved child rape and murder case 
Lim Yew Hock, second Chief Minister of Singapore
Abraham Lim (actor), American actor and singer
Adrian Lim (林宝龙), Singaporean medium and notorious child killer
Catherine Lim, Malaysian-born Singaporean author
Desiree Lim, Malaysian-born Canadian independent film director, producer, and screenwriter
Freddy Lim, Taiwanese musician and lead singer of Taiwanese metal band Chthonic
Jennifer Lim, British actress
Ken Lim, Singaporean record producer and composer
Kevin Lim, Indonesian singer and songwriter
Lee Hong Susan Lim, Malaysian parasitologist (1952-2014)
Moses Lim, T.V. and movie actor (e.g. "Just Follow Law"), food gourmet and entrepreneur from Singapore
Peter Lim, Singaporean billionaire
Phillip Lim, U.S. fashion designer 
Pik-Sen Lim (林碧笙), Malay-British actress
Rebecca Lim (林慧玲) (born 1986), Singaporean actress
Ron Lim, U.S. comic book artist
Tan Sri Lim Kok Thay, Chairman and C.E.O. of Genting Berhad conglomerate
Wendell Lim, Professor at University of California, San Francisco and director of SynBERC
Sondhi Limthongkul (林明達), Thai journalist, founder and owner of Manager Daily and political activist

Liem
Indonesian:
 John Liem Beng Kiat, Indonesian member of the Asia-Pacific Scout Committee
 Liem Bwan Tjie, Indonesian architect 
 Liem Koen Hian, Indonesian journalist and politician
 Liem Seeng Tee, founder of Sampoerna, one of the largest Indonesian tobacco companies
 Liem Sioe Liong, Indonesian tycoon
 Liem Swie King, Indonesian badminton player
 Liem Tien Pao, one of Indonesia's richest men
 Liem Tjoan Hok, Indonesian film director

Ling
Eastern Min, Northern Min, and Wu form:
Ling How Doong (林孝谆, 1934–2021), Singaporean politician and lawyer
Ling Liong Sik (林良实, born 1943), the sixth president of the Malaysian Chinese Association (MCA)
Jahja Ling (林望傑, born 1951)
Alan Ling Sie Kiong (林思健, born 1983), Malaysian lawyer
John Wey Ling (林建伟, born 1958 or 1959), Chinese-born American ballet dancer
Julia Ling (林小微, born 1983), American television actress
Landon Ling (林家亮, born 1987), Canadian football player
Tschen La Ling (林球立, born 1956), Dutch football player
Victor Ling (林重慶, born 1943), Chinese-born Canadian scientist

See also
Linn (surname)
Lyn (surname)
Lam (disambiguation), variant of Chinese Lin
List of common Chinese surnames
List of common Asian surnames

References

Chinese-language surnames
Individual Chinese surnames
Surnames of Malaysian origin